The Zhongshan Metro Shopping Mall is an extensive underground shopping mall in Zhongshan District and Datong District, Taipei, Taiwan. It is located at Changan West Rd., No. 52-1. The mall stretches from Taipei Main Station in the south to Shuanglian Station in the north.

Overview
The entire mall is 815 meters long and has 10 exits (plus 4 emergency exits). It was the first underground mall in Taipei. It has 81 shops.

See also
 Zhongshan Station
 Taipei Underground Market
 Station Front Metro Mall
 East Metro Mall
 Taipei City Mall

References

1999 establishments in Taiwan
Shopping malls in Taipei
Semi-subterranean structures
Underground cities in Taipei
Shopping malls established in 1999